Joanne Catherine Ellis (born 28 June 1981 in Cambridge, Cambridgeshire) is an English field hockey international, who was a member of the England and Great Britain women's field hockey team since 2002. She is not to be confused with another English field hockey player named Jo Ellis, who was born in 1983. She is now working at the mount school York.

References

 Profile

External links
 

1981 births
English female field hockey players
Living people
Olympic field hockey players of Great Britain
British female field hockey players
Field hockey players at the 2002 Commonwealth Games
Field hockey players at the 2006 Commonwealth Games
Field hockey players at the 2008 Summer Olympics
Sportspeople from Cambridge
Commonwealth Games silver medallists for England
Commonwealth Games bronze medallists for England
Commonwealth Games medallists in field hockey
Medallists at the 2002 Commonwealth Games
Medallists at the 2006 Commonwealth Games